Bob Sheldon (born 1950) is a former Major League Baseball second baseman.

Robert or Bob Sheldon may also refer to:

Bob Sheldon (book dealer), American activist and murder victim, founder of Internationalist Books
Bob Sheldon, a character in The Outsiders
Robert Sheldon, Baron Sheldon (born 1923), British Labour politician
 Bobby Sheldon (1883–1983), American businessman, government official and politician
 Robert Sheldon (composer) (born 1954), American composer

See also

Robert Shelton (disambiguation)